Eceabat District is a district of the Çanakkale Province of Turkey. Its seat is the town of Eceabat. Its area is 430 km2, and its population is 8,769 (2021).

Composition
There is one municipality in Eceabat District:
 Eceabat

There are 12 villages in Eceabat District:

 Alçıtepe
 Behramlı
 Beşyol
 Bigalı
 Büyükanafarta
 Kilidülbahir
 Kocadere
 Kumköy
 Küçükanafarta
 Seddülbahir
 Yalova
 Yolağzı

References

Districts of Çanakkale Province